The following Confederate States Army units and commanders fought in the Battle of Port Republic of the American Civil War. The Union order of battle is listed separately.

Abbreviations used

Military rank
 LTG = Lieutenant General
 MG = Major General
 BG = Brigadier General
 Col = Colonel
 Ltc = Lieutenant Colonel
 Maj = Major
 Cpt = Captain

Other
 w = wounded
 mw = mortally wounded
 k = killed

Department of the Valley
MG Thomas J. Jackson

References
 June 9, 1862 - Battle of Port Republic, Va. The War of the Rebellion: A Compilation of the Official Records of the Union and Confederate Armies. United States War Department.  Volume XII, Chapter XXIV, pp. 717–791.  (1885)

American Civil War orders of battle